München 7 is a German police drama series from Franz Xaver Bogner. The show is set in Munich, Germany and features the fictive police station "München 7" (which means "Munich 7").  The main characters are the "Sheriff from Marienplatz" Xaver Bartl and his new colleague Felix Kandler. Bavarian language is frequently used.

München 7 is part of a series of commonly branded shows with similar themes called Heiter bis tödlich.

See also
List of German television series

External links
 

2004 German television series debuts
2010s German television series
German crime television series
2000s German police procedural television series
2010s German police procedural television series
Television shows set in Munich
German-language television shows
Das Erste original programming
Grimme-Preis for fiction winners